The chemical compound 1,2-dichloroethane, commonly known as ethylene dichloride (EDC), is a chlorinated hydrocarbon.  It is a colourless liquid with a chloroform-like odour. The most common use of 1,2-dichloroethane is in the production of vinyl chloride, which is used to make polyvinyl chloride (PVC) pipes, furniture and automobile upholstery, wall coverings, housewares, and automobile parts. 1,2-Dichloroethane is also used generally as an intermediate for other organic chemical compounds, and as a solvent. It forms azeotropes with many other solvents, including water (at a boiling point of ) and other chlorocarbons.

History
In 1794, physician Jan Rudolph Deiman, merchant Adriaan Paets van Troostwijk, chemist Anthoni Lauwerenburg, and botanist Nicolaas Bondt, under the name of Society of Dutch Chemists, were the first to produce 1,2-dichloroethane from olefiant gas (oil-making gas, ethylene) and chlorine gas.  Although the Gezelschap in practice did not do much in-depth scientific research, they and their publications were highly regarded. Part of that acknowledgement is that 1,2-dichloroethane was called "Dutch oil" in old chemistry.  This is also the origin of the archaic term "olefiant gas" (oil-making gas) for ethylene, for in this reaction it is ethylene that makes the Dutch oil.  And "olefiant gas" is the etymological origin of the modern term "olefins", the family of hydrocarbons of which ethylene is the first member.

Production
Nearly 20 million tons of 1,2-dichloroethane are produced annually in the United States, Western Europe, and Japan. Production is primarily achieved through the iron(III) chloride-catalysed reaction of ethylene and chlorine:
 (ΔH⊖r = −218 kJ/mol)

1,2-dichloroethane is also generated by the copper(II) chloride-catalysed oxychlorination of ethylene:
 +

Uses

Vinyl chloride monomer (VCM) production
Approximately 95% of the world's production of 1,2-dichloroethane is used in the production of vinyl chloride monomer (VCM, chloroethene) with hydrogen chloride as a byproduct. VCM is the precursor to polyvinyl chloride.

The hydrogen chloride can be re-used in the production of more 1,2-dichloroethane via the oxychlorination route described above.

Other uses
1,2-Dichloroethane has been used as degreaser and paint remover but is now banned from use due to its toxicity and possible carcinogenity. As a useful 'building block' reagent, it is used as an intermediate in  the production of diverse organic compounds such as ethylenediamine and higher ethyleneamines.  In the laboratory it is occasionally used as a source of chlorine, with elimination of ethene and chloride.

Via several steps, 1,2-dichloroethane is a precursor to 1,1,1-trichloroethane. Historically, before leaded petrol was phased out, 1,2-dichloroethane was used as an anti-knock additive in petrol as a scavenging agent to prevent lead buildup.

Safety
1,2-Dichloroethane is highly flammable and releases hydrochloric acid when combusted:

 +  

It is also toxic (especially by inhalation due to its high vapour pressure) and possibly carcinogenic. Its high solubility and 50-year half-life in anoxic aquifers make it a perennial pollutant and health risk that is very expensive to treat conventionally, requiring a method of bioremediation. While the chemical is not used in consumer products manufactured in the U.S., a case was reported in 2009 of molded plastic consumer products (toys and holiday decorations) from China that released 1,2-dichloroethane into homes at levels high enough to produce cancer risk.
Substitutes are recommended and will vary according to application.  Dioxolane and toluene are possible substitutes as solvents.  Dichloroethane is unstable in the presence of aluminium metal and, when moist, with zinc and iron.

References

External links
 Gezelschap der Hollandsche Scheikundigen
  ChemicalLand compound database
 Environmental Chemistry compound database
 Merck Chemicals database
 National Pollutant Inventory – 1,2 Dichlorethane Fact Sheet
 Locating and estimating air emissions from sources of ethylene dichloride, EPA report EPA-450/4-84-007d, March 1984

Hazardous air pollutants
IARC Group 2B carcinogens
Organochloride insecticides
Chloroalkanes
Plastics
Halogenated solvents
Fuel additives